Thomas Grady Martin (January 17, 1929 – December 3, 2001) was an American session guitarist in country music and rockabilly.

A member of The Nashville A-Team, he played guitar on hits such as Marty Robbins' "El Paso", Loretta Lynn's "Coal Miner's Daughter" and Sammi Smith's "Help Me Make It Through the Night". During a nearly 50-year career, Martin backed such names as Hank Williams, Elvis Presley, Buddy Holly, Johnny Burnette, Don Woody and Arlo Guthrie, Johnny Cash, Patsy Cline and Bing Crosby. He is a member of the Rockabilly Hall of Fame and was elected to the Country Music Hall of Fame in March 2015.

Biography
Grady Martin was born in Chapel Hill, Tennessee, United States. He grew up on a farm with his oldest sister, Lois, his older brothers, June and Bill, and his parents, Claude and Bessey; and had a horse he named Trigger. His mother played the piano and encouraged his musical talent.

At age 15, Martin was invited to perform regularly on WLAC-AM in Nashville, Tennessee, and made his recording debut two years later on February 15, 1946 with Curly Fox and Texas Ruby in Chicago, Illinois.

That same year, he joined Paul Howard's Western swing-oriented Arkansas Cotton Pickers as half of Howard's twin guitar ensemble with Robert "Jabbo" Arrington and performed on the Grand Ole Opry. When Howard left, Opry newcomer Little Jimmy Dickens hired several former Cotton Pickers, including Martin, as his original Country Boys road band. He later joined Big Jeff Bess and the Radio Playboys followed by a stint with the Bailes Brothers Band.

By 1950, Martin was a part of the rising Nashville recording scene as a studio guitarist and fiddler, and his guitar hooks propelled Red Foley's "Chattanoogie Shoe Shine Boy" and "Birmingham Bounce". In 1951, he signed with Decca Records with his own country-jazz band, Grady Martin and the Slew Foot Five. In addition to backing mainstream acts like Bing Crosby and Burl Ives, they began to record in their own right, with later sessions under the name Grady Martin and his Winging Strings when he introduced his twin-neck Bigsby guitar.  The band, with Hank Garland, Bob Moore, Tommy Jackson and Bud Isaacs made regular appearances on ABC-TV's Ozark Jubilee in the mid-1950s.

The Nashville A-Team
It was as a session musician starting in the late 1950s that Martin made his greatest mark on country and rockabilly music.

As a guitarist with The Nashville A-Team, he provided the guitar on the Marty Robbins hits  "El Paso" (1959) and "Don't Worry" (1961), on Roy Orbison's "Oh, Pretty Woman" (1964) and Lefty Frizzell's "Saginaw, Michigan" (1964). His guitar work was also displayed in Johnny Horton's "The Battle of New Orleans" (1959) and "Honky Tonk Man" (1956), and especially his pure rockabilly sound on "I'm Coming Home" (1957). He shaped countless other classics, including Brenda Lee's "I'm Sorry", Willie Nelson's "On the Road Again", Ray Price's "For the Good Times" and Jeanne Pruett's "Satin Sheets".

Martin is credited with accidentally stumbling onto the electric guitar "fuzz" effect during a recording session with Robbins at Nashville's Quonset Hut Studio; his guitar was run through a faulty channel in a mixing console, generating the fuzz sound on "Don't Worry".

In the 1960s, he played on sessions with Joan Baez, J. J. Cale and others, and played on Sammi Smith's 1971 hit, "Help Me Make it Through the Night", among the most successful country singles of all time. In the early 1970s, Martin played on many records by Loretta Lynn and Conway Twitty, worked with Kris Kristofferson and produced the country-rock band Brush Arbor.

With Patsy Cline
Martin appeared on almost all of Cline's Decca sessions, from August 1961 to her last session in February 1962, during which time he backed her on songs such as:

"Crazy" 
"She's Got You"
"Foolin' Around"
"Seven Lonely Days"
"You Belong to Me"
"Heartaches"
"True Love"
"Faded Love"
"Someday (You'll Want Me to Want You)"
"Sweet Dreams"
"Crazy Arms"
"San Antonio Rose"
"The Wayward Wind"
"A Poor Man's Roses (Or a Rich Man's Gold)"
"Have You Ever Been Lonely (Have You Ever Been Blue)?"
"South of the Border (Down Mexico Way)"
"Walkin' After Midnight" (1961 recording)
"You Made Me Love You (I Didn't Want To Do It)"
"Your Cheatin' Heart"
"That's My Desire"
"Half As Much"
"I Can't Help It (If I'm Still in Love with You)"
"Leavin' On Your Mind"
"Someday (You'll Want Me To Want You)"
"Love Letters In The Sand"
"Blue Moon of Kentucky"

Later years
In 1978, with his studio career over, Martin returned to the life of a touring musician, first with Jerry Reed and then as lead guitarist for Willie Nelson's band, appearing in Nelson's 1980 film Honeysuckle Rose. In 1994, deteriorating health forced him to retire, but he produced Nelson's 1995 honky tonk album, Just One Love. 
 
The Nashville Entertainment Association gave him its first Master Award in 1983, and he was the 83rd inductee into the Rockabilly Hall of Fame. On April 5, 2000, he received a Chetty award for significant instrumental achievement at Nashville's Ryman Auditorium during the Chet Atkins Musician Days festival. Health problems prevented Martin from attending; Nelson, Vince Gill and Marty Stuart presented the award—named after Atkins, who attended—to Martin's son, Joshua. Grady Martin was inducted into the Musicians Hall of Fame in 2007.

He was married three times and had three daughters, Alisa, Angie and Julie; and seven sons, Grady Jr., Joe, Tal, Jason, Joshua, Justin and Steve.
 
Martin died from a heart attack on December 3, 2001 in Lewisburg, Tennessee, and was interred at Hopper Cemetery in Marshall County, Tennessee.

Selected discography

Grady Martin and the Slew Foot Five
Powerhouse Dance Party (Decca, 1956)
Juke Box Jamboree (Decca, 1956)
The Roaring Twenties (Decca, 1957)
  'Johnny Burnette and The Rock and Roll Trio ' (1957 LP) - (July 5th session: long believed all to be by Paul Burlison) - Recorded at Quonset Studio, 16th Avenue South, Nashville, Tennessee, July 2-5, 1956; lp includes songs recorded in 1957, at Pythian Temple (New York City)
Hot Time Tonight (Decca, 1959)
Big City Lights (Decca, 1960)
Swingin' Down the River (Decca, 1962)
Songs Everybody Knows (Decca, 1964)

Grady Martin
Instrumentally Yours (Decca, 1965)
A Touch of Country (Decca, 1967)
Cowboy Classics (Decca, 1977)

Slewfoot Five
The Happy Sound of the Slewfoot Five (Decca, 1967)
Man Alive! It's the Slew Foot Five (Decca, 1968)

As sideman
With Eric Andersen
 Blue River (Columbia Records, 1972)

With Hoyt Axton
 American Dreams (Global Records, 1984)

With Joan Baez
 Any Day Now (Vanguard Records, 1968)
 David's Album (Vanguard Records, 1969)
 One Day at a Time (Vanguard Records, 1970)
 Come from the Shadows (A&M Records, 1972)
 Where Are You Now, My Son? (A&M Records, 1973)

With J. J. Cale
 Okie (Shelter Records, 1974)

With Arlo Guthrie
 Last of the Brooklyn Cowboys (Reprise Records, 1973)

With Ronnie Hawkins
 Rock and Roll Resurrection (Monument Records, 1972)
 Giant of Rock 'n' Roll (Monument Records, 1974)

With Roy Orbison
 Regeneration (Monument Records, 1976)

With John Prine
 Sweet Revenge (Atlantic Records, 1973)

With Leon Russell
 Hank Wilson's Back Vol. I (Shelter Records, 1973)

With Kai Winding
 Modern Country (Verve, 1964)

References

External links

Watch and hear Grady Martin videos and music on son Tal Martin's MySpace page
Grady Martin biography at CMT.com
Grady Martin biography by son Josh Martin at Nashvillesound.com
Grady Martin tribute website
Grady Martin and Bob Moore tribute website 

 Grady Martin recordings at the Discography of American Historical Recordings.

1929 births
2001 deaths
People from Chapel Hill, Tennessee
American country singer-songwriters
American country guitarists
American male guitarists
American session musicians
American rockabilly musicians
Singer-songwriters from Tennessee
Decca Records artists
Monument Records artists
20th-century American singers
20th-century American guitarists
Guitarists from Tennessee
Country Music Hall of Fame inductees
Country musicians from Tennessee
20th-century American male musicians
American male singer-songwriters
Drifting Cowboys members